Eriverton Santos Lima (born 1 January 1978 in Porto da Folha, Sergipe), or simply Eriverton, is a Brazilian footballer who played midfielder. He currently plays for Moreirense. Eriverton is a typical playmaker with very precise pass and good techniques.

Career
In 2005, he went to Portugal and signed with Moreirense F.C.  For two years played in 40 caps and scored 6 goals. In June 2006 Lima signed with other Portuguese club Portimonense S.C. There he played in 25 caps and scored 1 goal. In next year he went to Bulgaria and signed with FC Vihren Sandanski for a free transfer. In December 2008 Eriverton scored three goals for Vihren in a match against Spartak Plovdiv for a Bulgarian Cup. A few days later the fans of Vihren chose Eriverton for "The best player of Vihren for 2008".

External links
Brazilian FA Database  

1978 births
Living people
Brazilian footballers
Brazilian expatriate footballers
Association football midfielders
Associação Desportiva Confiança players
Clube Atlético do Porto players
Santa Cruz Futebol Clube players
Portimonense S.C. players
First Professional Football League (Bulgaria) players
Expatriate footballers in Bulgaria
Expatriate footballers in Portugal
Sportspeople from Sergipe